Sandplace railway station is an intermediate station on the scenic Looe Valley Line in Cornwall, England, United Kingdom.

The single platform is on the left of trains arriving from Liskeard.

History

The Liskeard and Looe Railway was opened on 27 December 1860 to carry goods traffic; passenger trains started on 11 September 1879, but Sandplace did not have a station until December 1881.  A goods siding was provided a little distance south of the station but has been closed for many years.

Facilities 
The only facilities provided at the station are a small waiting shelter, a bench and an information board, with timetable posters. There are no ticket buying facilities, so passengers have to buy a ticket in advance or from the guard on the train.

Services

All trains on the "Looe Valley Line" from Liskeard to Looe stop at Sandplace on request – this means that passengers alighting here must tell the conductor that they wish to do so, and those waiting to join must signal clearly to the driver as the train approaches.  There is no Sunday service in the winter.

Community rail
The railway between Liskeard and Looe is designated as a community rail line and is supported by marketing provided by the Devon and Cornwall Rail Partnership.  The line is promoted under the "Looe Valley Line" name.

The "Polraen Country House Hotel" is included in the Looe Valley Line rail ale trail.  This is one of the most difficult rail ale trail pubs to visit as it has very limited opening hours.

Cultural References 
Sandplace is one of the stations named in Bernard Moore's poem Travelling.

References

Bibliography 
 
 
 
 
 
 
 

Railway stations in Cornwall
Former Liskeard and Looe Railway stations
Railway stations in Great Britain opened in 1881
Railway stations served by Great Western Railway
Railway request stops in Great Britain
1881 establishments in England
DfT Category F2 stations